Sirkka is a Finnish female given name.

Famous people
 Sirkka Aro, writer
 Sirkka Garam, writer
 Sirkka-Liisa Hahmo, linguist
 Sirkka Hirsjärvi, professor and writer
 Sirkka Karppanen, writer
 Sirkka Keiski, singer
 Sirkka-Liisa Kivelä, professor
 Sirkka Klemetti, writer
 Sirkka-Liisa Konttinen, photographer 
 Sirkka Kupila-Ahvenniemi, professor 
 Sirkka Kuula, violin player
 Sirkka Laine, writer
 Sirkka Lamminen (Lampimäki), singer
 Sirkka-Liisa Lonka, artist
 Sirkka Saari, Sirkka Suortti, writer
Sirkka Salonen, model
 Sirkka Saarinen, linguist and professori
 Sirkka Saarnio, actor
 Sirkka Salonen, Miss Finland 1938
 Sirkka Soulanto, writer
 Sirkka Turkka, poet

References

Finnish feminine given names